This is a list of compositions by the Norwegian composer Christian Sinding.

Piano

Piano solo
Suite for piano, Op. 3
Etude, Op. 7
Skizze, Op. 20
Fünf Stücke, Op. 24
Sieben Stücke, Op. 25
Sechs Stücke, Op. 31
Marche grotesque, Op. 32, No. 1
Frühlingsrauschen, Op. 32, No. 3
Popular song, Op. 32, No. 4
Rondoletto giocoso, Op.32 No. 5
Serenade, Op. 33, No. 4
Sechs Charakterstücke, Op. 34
15 Caprices, Op. 44
Six Burlesques, Op. 48
Melodies Mignonnes, Op. 52
Quatre Morceaux Caractéristiques, Op. 53
Quatre Morceaux de Salon, Op. 54
Cinq Études, Op. 58
Fünf Stücke, Op. 62
Acht Intermezzi, Op. 65
Acht Intermezzi, Op. 72
Sechs Stücke, Op. 74
Mélodie, Op. 76
Zehn Studien und Skizzen, Op. 82
Quatre Morceaux, Op. 84
Sieben Stücke, Op. 86
Drei Stücke, Op. 88
Piano Sonata in B minor, Op. 91
Quatre Miniatures, Op. 93
Fatum, Op. 94
Des Morgens, Op. 97, No. 1
Auf dem Wasser, Op. 97, No. 2
Intermezzo, Op. 97, No. 3
Gewitter, Op. 97, No. 4
Aquarell, Op. 97, No. 5
Stimmung Op. 103, No. 5
Zehn Jugendbilder, Op. 110
Fünf Stücke, Op. 113
Sechs Stücke, Op. 115
Drei Intermezzi, Op. 116
Fantaisies, Op. 118
Am Spinett, Op. 122
Drei Stücke, Op. 125
Drei Stücke, Op. 127
Cinq Compositions, Op. 128a
Serenade
Irrlicht
Alla Marchia
Pompose
Piano Sonata in F minor

Piano, four hands
Suite for piano 4 hands in F major, Op. 35a
Waltzes for piano 4 hands in G major (1st version), Op. 59, No. 3
Waltzes for piano 4 hands in G major (2nd version), Op. 59, No. 3
Waltzes for piano 4 hands in E minor, Op. 59, No. 4
Acht Stücke for piano 4 hands, Op. 71
Nordische Tänze und Weisen for piano 4 hands, Op. 98

Two pianos
Variations for two pianos in E-flat major, Op. 2
Andante for two pianos, Op. 41, No. 1

Instrument solo
Suite in D minor for violin solo, Op. 123

Chamber music

Violin and piano
Romance in e minor for violin and piano, Op. 9
Suite ‘Im alten Stil’ for violin and piano, Op. 10
Violin Sonata in C major, Op. 12
Suite in F major, Op. 14
Violin Sonata in E major, Op. 27
Romance in e minor for violin and piano, Op. 30
Prélude for violin and piano, Op. 43, No. 3
Scènes de la Vie for violin and piano, Op. 51
Elegy for violin and piano, Op. 61, No. 2
Ballade for violin and piano, Op. 61, No. 3
Violin Sonata in F major, Op. 73
Cantus doloris (Mourning Song) for violin and piano, Op. 78
Romance in F major for violin and piano, Op. 79, No. 1
Romance for violin and piano, Op. 79, No. 2
Air for violin and piano, Op. 81, No. 1
Ständchen for violin and piano, Op. 89, No. 1
Abendlied for violin and piano, Op. 89, No. 3
Suite in G minor for violin and piano, Op. 96
Violin Sonata ‘Im alten Stil’ in D minor, Op. 99
Romance for violin and piano, Op. 100
Elegy for violin and piano, Op. 106, No. 1
Berceuse for violin and piano, Op. 106, No. 2
Andante religioso for violin and piano, Op. 106, No. 3
Drei Präludien for violin and piano, Op. 112
Drei Capricci for violin and piano, Op. 114
Abendstimmung, Op. 120a
Violin Sonata in A major
Violin Sonata in G major

Cello and piano
Sechs Stücke for cello and piano, Op. 66
Nordische Ballade for cello and piano, Op. 105

Piano trio
Piano Trio No. 1 in D major, Op. 23
Piano Trio No. 2 in A minor, Op. 64, dedicated to The Dutch Trio
Piano Trio No. 3 in C major, Op. 87

Piano quartet
Piano Quartet

Piano quintet
Piano Quintet in E minor, Op. 5

String quartet
String Quartet in A minor, Op. 70
String Quartet

Other
Serenade for 2 violins and piano, Op. 56, No. 1
Serenade for 2 violins and piano, Op. 92, No. 2

Organ
Hymnus, Op. 124

Orchestral

Symphonies
Symphony No. 1 in D minor, Op. 21
Symphony No. 2 in D major, Op. 83
Symphony No. 3 in F major, Op. 121
Symphony No. 4, rhapsody for orchestra (‘Frost and Spring’), Op. 129

Piano and orchestra
Piano Concerto in D-flat major, Op. 6

Violin and orchestra
Suite in A minor for violin and orchestra, Op. 10
Violin Concerto No. 1 in A major, Op. 45
Legende for violin and orchestra, Op. 46
Violin Concerto No. 2 in D major, Op. 60
Romance in D major for violin and orchestra, Op. 100
Violin Concerto No. 3 in A minor, Op. 119
Abendstimmung for violin and orchestra, Op. 120a

Other
Episodes Chevaleresques, Op. 35b
Rondo Infinito for orchestra, Op. 42
Feststimmung in Skorpen, Op. 120b
Overture for orchestra

Choral music
Til Molde, Op. 16 – cantata for mixed choir, orchestra, and baritone solo.
Fire Sange, Op. 47
Mannamaal, Op. 67
Kantate ved Hundreaarsfesten i det Kongelige Selskab for Norges Ve, Op. 102
Zwei Lieder, Op. 104
Vier Lieder, Op. 108
Jubilæumskantate, Op. 117
Carmen Nuptiale
Kantate ved Abeljubilæet

Lieder
Alte Weisen, Op. 1
Ranker og Roser, Op. 4
Tekster, Op. 8
Sechs Lieder und Gesänge, Op. 11
Ti Digte af 'Sangenes Bog', Op. 13
Maria Gnadenmutter (Mary Mother of Mercy), Op. 15, No. 1
Rosmarin, Op. 15, No. 2
Es starben zwei Schwestern (Two sisters Died), Op. 15, No. 3
Die Bettelfrau singt (The Beggar Woman Sings), Op. 15, No. 4
Wiegenlied (Lullaby), Op. 15, No. 5
Fem Sange, Op. 17
Seks Sange, Op. 18
Fem Sange, Op. 19
Galmandssange, Op. 22
Zehn Lieder aus Winternächte, Op. 26
Symra, Op. 28
Rytmeskvulp, Op. 29
Fra Vår til Høst, Op. 36
Tonar, Op. 37
Bersøglis og Andre Viser, Op. 38
Fire Gamle Danske Romanser, Op. 39
Strengjeleik, Op. 40
14 Danske Viser og Sange, Op. 50
Sylvelin og Andre Viser, Op. 55
Nemt, Frouwe, Disen Kranz, Op. 57
Fünf Duette, Op. 63
Roland zu Bremen, Op. 64b
Fire Songar, Op. 68
Fem Songar, Op. 69
Symra, Op. 75
Sieben Gedichte, Op. 77
Inga, Op. 80, No. 4
No dalar Soli (Now the Sun is Sinking), Op. 80, No. 5
Kvælden (Evening), Op. 80, No. 7
Gedichte, Op. 85
Nyinger, Op. 90
Tre Blomstersange, Op. 95
Vier Gedichte, Op. 101
Vier Balladen und Lieder, Op. 107
Vier Balladen und Lieder, Op. 109
A Cradle Song, Op. 126, No. 1
Barcarole, Op. 128, No. 4
Farvel (Farewell), Op. 130, No. 2
Spring Day
Narcissus
Amber: Rav
Little Kirsten
A Bird Cried
It Is a Summer Evening as Before
Sylvelin
The Maiden In the Poppy Field
There Once Was a Little Hen
Poppy in the Field
Mother of God, Exalted, Mild
A Frightened Bird Flies from the Grove
The Stars Shine So Red
The Dark Wine
In Forest Lies a Calm Lake
Mary, Mother of Mercy
Many Dreams
A Woman
Boat-Song
How the Bright Moon Shines
My Eyes Shine
Little Rose Bit into the Apple
I Fear No Ghosts
All My Wisdom
Song of a Little Sunshine
The Arabian Tale of Antar and Abla (Sange af den Arabiske fortoelling Antar og Abla): Stridssang (Battle Hymn)
The Arabian Tale of Antar and Abla (Sange af den Arabiske fortoelling Antar og Abla), for voice & piano: Kjærlighetssang (Love Song)
Sulamith’s Sang
To Sange
Bondesang
Et Efterår
End Er Jeg Stemt
Til Edvard og Nina Grieg
Mot
Perler
Die heiligen drei Könige
The New Moon

External links
List of compositions at Klassika 
List of compositions at AllMusic

Sinding, Christian